Lauret may refer to the following places in France:

Lauret, Hérault, a commune in the Hérault department 
Lauret, Landes, a commune in the Landes department